Serranilla Bank ( and Placer de la Serranilla) is a partially submerged reef, with small uninhabited islets, in the western Caribbean Sea.

Serranilla Bank was first shown on Spanish maps in 1510. It is administered by Colombia as part of the department of San Andrés and Providencia. The reef is subject to a sovereignty dispute involving Colombia, Honduras and the United States.  In 2012, in regards to Nicaraguan claims to the islands, the International Court of Justice (ICJ) upheld Colombia's sovereignty over the bank, although the judgment does not analyze or mention the claims of Honduras or United States over the reef.

Geography 
Serranilla Bank is a former atoll, now a mostly submerged carbonate platform consisting of shallow reef environments. It is about 40 km in length and 32 km in width, covering an area of over 1,200 km2, almost entirely under water. Three small cays and two rocks emerge above the water to form the bank's islands. These are West Breaker, Middle Cay, East Cay, Beacon Cay and Northeast Breaker. They are largely barren, with sparse vegetation of bushes and some trees. Many shipwrecks are located in its vicinity.  The bank lacks coral reefs and has minimal sediment cover.  Accretion of the bank is not keeping up with sea level rise.  The southeastern portion is covered mainly by hardgrounds, while the rest of the bank is mostly covered by thin Halimeda sediments.

Beacon Cay is the largest islet in the Bank. It is overbuilt with small military facilities, which house a small rotating garrison of Colombian naval personnel. There is a lighthouse on a coral ledge in the southwest approach to the bank. It is a 33 m (108 ft) tall skeletal tower built atop a 3-storey crew residence. The lamp emits a focal plane beam of light as two white flashes every 20 seconds. The current lighthouse was first erected in 1982, and was reconstructed in May 2008 by the Colombian Ministry of Defence. It is currently maintained by the Colombian Navy, and overseen by the state's Maritime Authority.

History 
The Serranilla Bank was first shown on Spanish maps in 1510 as Placer de la Serranilla. It was mentioned by Louis-Michel Aury whose ship was shipwrecked on it in 1820. In later history it has been the subject of conflicting claims made by a number of sovereign states. In most cases, the dispute stems from attempts by a state to expand its exclusive economic zone over the surrounding seas.

Between 1982 and 1986, Colombia maintained a formal agreement with Jamaica which granted regulated fishing rights to Jamaican vessels within the territorial waters of Serranilla Bank and nearby Bajo Nuevo Bank. In November 1993, the two states agreed upon a maritime delimitation treaty establishing a "Joint Regime Area" to cooperatively manage and exploit living and non-living resources in designated waters between the two banks. However, the territorial waters immediately surrounding the cays themselves were excluded from the zone of joint-control, as Colombia considers these areas to be part of her coastal waters. The agreement came into force in March 1994.

Nicaragua lays claim to all the islands on its continental shelf, covering an area of over 50,000 km2 in the Caribbean Sea, including the Serranilla Bank and all islands associated with the San Andrés and Providencia archipelagoes. It has persistently pursued this claim against Colombia in the International Court of Justice (ICJ), filing cases in both 2001 and 2007.

The United States' claim was made in 1879 and 1880 under the Guano Islands Act by James W. Jennett. Most claims made by the U.S. over the guano islands in this region were officially renounced in a treaty with Colombia, dated September 1972. But whether or not Serranilla Bank was included in the agreement is disputed—there is no specific mention of the feature in the treaty and, as per Article 7 of the said treaty, only matters specifically mentioned in the document are subject to it. According to other records, as well as claims made within the ICJ, Colombia is recognised by the United States as having varying degrees of sovereignty over Serranilla Bank through the treaty of 1972, which took effect in September 1981. The U.S. considers the reef to be an unorganized, unincorporated United States territory.

Honduras claims Serranilla Bank as part of its national territory in Article 10 of its Constitution. In 1986, it agreed upon a maritime boundary demarcation with Colombia that excluded Honduras of any control over the bank or its surrounding waters. The ratification of this boundary on 20 December 1999 proved to be controversial within Honduras, as it ensured that the state implicitly recognised Colombia's sovereignty over the claimed territory. Nicaragua, which has not resolved its maritime borders with Honduras or Colombia, disputed Honduras' legal right to hand over these areas before the ICJ. Despite the agreement with Colombia, however, the Honduran government has yet to officially renounce the claim in the Constitution.

Notable fauna 
In 1952, Serranilla bank was the site of the last sighting of the now extinct Caribbean monk seal.

See also 
 Alice Shoal
 List of Guano Island claims
 Rosalind Bank

References

External links 
  – aerial image of Serranilla Bank
 Photos of the islands on Panoramio:  

Atolls of the North Atlantic Ocean
Atolls of Colombia
Atolls of the United States
Caribbean islands of Colombia
Disputed islands
Insular areas of the United States
International territorial disputes of the United States
Caribbean islands claimed under the Guano Islands Act
Islands of the Archipelago of San Andrés, Providencia and Santa Catalina
Islands of the West Caribbean
Reefs of the Atlantic Ocean
Territorial disputes of Colombia
Territorial disputes of Honduras
Territorial disputes of Nicaragua
Uninhabited Caribbean islands of the United States
Uninhabited islands of Colombia
Uninhabited islands of Honduras
Uninhabited islands of Nicaragua
Colombia–Honduras relations
Colombia–United States relations
Colombia–Nicaragua relations